Rodney Osborne "Rocky" Childress (born February 18, 1962) is an American former professional baseball pitcher. He played all or part of four seasons in Major League Baseball (MLB), from 1985 until 1988, for the Philadelphia Phillies and Houston Astros.

External links

Major League Baseball pitchers
Philadelphia Phillies players
Houston Astros players
Helena Phillies players
Bend Phillies players
Spartanburg Traders players
Peninsula Pilots players
Reading Phillies players
Portland Beavers players
Tucson Toros players
Tidewater Tides players
Bend Bandits players
Baseball players from California
Sportspeople from Santa Rosa, California
1962 births
Living people